Michael Wylde (born 6 January 1987) is an English footballer who plays as a defender. He last played for Conference Premier side Alfreton Town.

Club career

Cheltenham Town
Born in Birmingham, West Midlands, Wylde signed his first professional contract with The Robins aged 19-year-old. Wylde suffered a broken jaw in a clash with Cheltenham Town teammate Shane Duff in a pre-season friendly against Hereford United on 4 August 2007.

Kidderminster Harriers
To gain first team experience, Wylde along with Plymouth Argyle player Jake Moult joined Conference National side Kidderminster Harriers in March 2008 on loan for the remainder of the season.

Tamworth
Wylde was part of the successful Tamworth squad that earned promotion to the Conference National by winning the Conference North in the 2008–09 season. He signed a new contract in May 2009 to commit to the new season in the Conference National. Following the end of a rather successful 2009/10 season, Wylde was expected to join former side Kidderminster Harriers. However this never happened and he committed his future to the Lambs for another season, penned a 12-month deal.

Cambridge United
On 31 May 2011, it was announced that Michael Wylde had joined Cambridge United on a free, signing a two-year contract with the club. He joined AFC Telford United on a one-month loan in November 2012, playing three times. Following his loan spell, Wylde's contract at Cambridge was cancelled by mutual consent in January 2013 after manager Richard Money confirmed that he would take no further part in their season.

Return to Tamworth 
After his release Wylde returned to Tamworth until the end of the 2012–13 season. He left the club in June 2013 after the club decided against offering him a new contract.

Alfreton Town
Wylde joined Alfreton Town in June 2013, signing a one-year contract and made his first appearance as a substitute in a 3–1 defeat to Forest Green Rovers.

International career
Along with teammate Alex Rodman, Wylde received a call up for the England C team to play against Estonia U23 on 13 October 2010.

Career statistics

References

External links

Michael Wylde profile at Alfreton Town F.C.

1987 births
Living people
Footballers from Birmingham, West Midlands
English footballers
England semi-pro international footballers
Association football defenders
Cheltenham Town F.C. players
Kidderminster Harriers F.C. players
Tamworth F.C. players
Cambridge United F.C. players
AFC Telford United players
Alfreton Town F.C. players
English Football League players
National League (English football) players